Ciudad Salitre is a neighborhood (barrio), spanning the localities Teusaquillo and Fontibón of Bogotá, Colombia.

Limits 
 North: Avenida El Dorado
 South: San Francisco River
 West: Avenida Boyacá
 East: Carrera 50

Description 

The Maloka Museum and Avianca headquarters are located in the neighborhood.

References 

Neighbourhoods of Bogotá
Teusaquillo